Frank Baylis (born November 15, 1962) is a Canadian businessperson and politician, who was elected to represent the riding of Pierrefonds—Dollard in the House of Commons of Canada in the 2015 federal election. He did not run for reelection in 2019.

Baylis is the president of Baylis Medical, a medical technology firm. In 2011, along with his partner Kris Shah, he received the Entrepreneur of the Year Award from Ernst and Young. He is also a producer with the film production house Walk of Fame Entertainment. In addition to being its producer, he has co-written several screenplays, two of which have been made into feature films.

Early life and education

Frank Baylis’ father, Richard Baylis, immigrated to Canada from the United Kingdom in 1956, and his mother, Gloria Baylis (née Clarke), originally from Barbados, immigrated to Canada in 1952. Frank Baylis has three siblings, Dr. Francoise Baylis, Dr. Peter Baylis, and Dr. Penny Baylis. While initially from the Greater Montreal area, Baylis spent part of his youth living in Toronto before going off to university. Baylis holds a bachelor's degree in electrical engineering from the University of Waterloo. He graduated in 1986 with honours. Baylis currently lives in the West Island of Montreal and is married with three children.

Business career
Before being elected to the House of Commons, Frank Baylis was involved in the business of industrial manufacturing and consulting industry. In more recent years, Baylis has also been involved in the entertainment industry.

Baylis Medical Company Inc.
Frank Baylis served as President of Baylis Medical Company from 1989 to 2015. Baylis Medical Company, originally a small distribution company of neurological devices, is now an internationally renowned leading developer of medical devices used in cardiology and spinal procedures. Baylis Medical currently employs over 750 staff and markets its products in over 50 countries. It has offices in Montreal, Toronto, Boston, and London, England. Currently, Baylis is Chairman of the Board of Baylis Medical.

In August 2020 during the COVID-19 pandemic, it was reported that a company owned by Baylis had been awarded a contract of 237 millions CAD$ to purchase ventilators. This raised questions about conflict of interest of granting such a contract to a company owned by a former member of parliament.

OME Group Inc.
In 1991 Frank Baylis founded and owned OME Group along with his business partner Kris Shah. As the Vice President of OME Group, Baylis oversaw all business activities in the Montreal office from 1991 to 2011.  OME Group was a specialized consulting company that provided Scientific Research and Experimental Development (SR&ED) tax consulting services to businesses across Canada. OME Group was sold to Ernst and Young in 2011.

Walk of Fame Entertainment
From 2007 to 2015 Baylis was a producer with the company Walk of Fame Entertainment; a video production house. In addition to being a producer, Baylis has written several screenplays and appeared as an actor in select creative works.

Politics
On November 18, 2014, Frank Baylis won the nomination race for the Liberal Party of Canada in the riding of Pierrefonds—Dollard.

On October 19, 2015, Baylis won the electoral riding of Pierrefonds-Dollard with 58.7% of the vote. After the election, Baylis joined the Canadian House of Commons Standing Committee on Industry, Science and Technology. Baylis was also the Chair of the Canada—United-Kingdom Inter-Parliamentary Association.

Awards and honours
Over the years, Frank Baylis has received various awards and honours for both his business success and his charitable work.

 In 2011, Baylis and his partner Kris Shah received the Entrepreneur of the Year Award – Life Sciences from Ernst and Young. This award was given in recognition for the impressive success of Baylis Medical Company.
 Baylis’ community involvement and commitment to service earned him the Queen Elizabeth II Diamond Jubilee Medal from the Governor General of Canada David Johnston, in 2012.
Baylis received the MDA Award while at University of Waterloo for achieving academic excellence while positively contributing to student life on campus through extra-curricular activities.
 As a teenager, Baylis received the Chief Scout's Award (Scouts Canada). The Chief Scout's Award is the highest award given out by Scouts Canada. It recognizes achievements in outdoor skills, leadership, and community service.

Electoral record

References

1962 births
Living people
Businesspeople from Montreal
Members of the House of Commons of Canada from Quebec
Liberal Party of Canada MPs
Canadian male screenwriters
Businesspeople in the health care industry
Politicians from Montreal
Writers from Montreal
Canadian electrical engineers
University of Waterloo alumni
Black Canadian politicians
Canadian people of Barbadian descent
Canadian people of British descent
Black Canadian businesspeople
21st-century Canadian politicians
21st-century Canadian screenwriters
21st-century Canadian male writers